Timothy O'Donnell or  Tim O'Donnell may refer to:

 Timothy T. O'Donnell, Catholic theologian
 Timothy O'Donnell (triathlete) (born 1980), American triathlete
 Tim O'Donnell (director), American television director
 Tim O'Donnell (Gaelic footballer) (1907–2003), Irish Gaelic footballer